Trumper is a surname. Notable people with the surname include:

Notable People
Gillian Trumper (1936–2019), Canadian politician
Lutz Trümper (born 1955), German politician
Simon Trumper (born 1963), English poker player
Victor Trumper (1877–1915), Australian cricketer

Fictional People
Anthony Trumper, the main antagonist from Shaun the Sheep Movie

See also
Geo. F. Trumper, barbershop
Trumper Park Oval
Trumpers Crossing Halte railway station
Trump (surname)